Sarıyer is the northernmost district of Istanbul, Turkey, on the European side of the city. It consists of the neighbourhoods of Rumelifeneri, Tarabya, Yeniköy, İstinye, Emirgan and Rumelihisarı. Sarıyer also administers the Black Sea coast to the west of the mouth of the Bosphorus, including the neighbourhood of Kilyos. It borders Eyüp to the northwest, Beşiktaş to the south and Kağıthane to the west. Sarıyer has a population of approximately 350,000. The mayor is Şükrü Genç of the Republican People's Party (CHP). In 1930, some parts of the region of Beyoğlu and Çatalca were incorporated into Sarıyer, which also became the district centre. The district's boundaries shrunk after the neighbourhood of Kemerburgaz was given to the Eyüp district in 1936 and when the villages of Maslak and Ayazağa were given to Şişli district in 1954. The present boundaries of Sarıyer were created after incorporating the neighbourhoods of Maslak, Ayazağa and Huzur from the district of Şişli in 2012.

History 
Sarıyer's Bosphorus villages, backed by steep hills, were once rural fishing communities. They later became retreats for the upperclass. In the Ottoman period, the sultans came to these villages for picnics and excursions. During the 18th and 19th centuries, the coast was lined with summer residences of the wealthy foreign traders of Pera and Galata. Several foreign embassies built summer residences during this period. Since the construction of the coast road, these villages, and increasingly the hillsides behind them, house many expensive villas owned by İstanbul's rich businessmen, actors and musicians, attracted by the coastline and the lush forest behind.

Sarıyer today

Sarıyer is connected to downtown Istanbul by Büyükdere Road, the main road from Beşiktaş up to Maslak and beyond; this is the route used by minibuses serving Sarıyer-Beşiktaş. There is also high-speed ferry boat service for commuting to the city. However, as a drive through Sarıyer during commute times and rush hour will attest, many people commute by car.

Sarıyer itself is a traditional working-class Turkish town, lacking in infrastructure. The industry feeds the local fish market and a long line of famous fish restaurants. There are also a variety of cafés, kebab houses and bars, where many of İstanbul's residents come to eat and drink on weekends. Many of the restaurants are owned by famous musicians, who sometimes put on live shows for customers.

Emirgan is former retreat from the city, backed by a hillside still green despite the recent construction of villas within it. The district is named for the Ottoman lords (Emirs) that came here on excursions. There is a square in the center, shaded by a huge plane tree, with a cafe in the middle. Home to the Sakıp Sabancı Museum.

Reşitpaşa is a crowded district on the hill above Emirgan. It is a big village, with attractive villas and much illegal gecekondu housing on a forested hillside. The modern campus of the Istanbul Stock Exchange is nearby, along with one of the campuses of Istanbul Technical University and a large new mall, Istinye Park.

Istinye is a fishing port, which once contained a shipyard, with a village behind and tea gardens by the sea. As in so many other areas, luxury condos now rise from Istinye's hillsides. In 2003 the imposing American consulate was built here. The town's stream was once polluted with sewage. The stream is now biologically treated to eradicate any effluent to the Bosphorus.

Yeniköy consists of luxury villas on a hillside and a small area of tightly packed old houses near the sea. The latter area, the old village, has a longstanding Greek community, evidenced by its Orthodox churches. Yeniköy's long-established cafes and bakeries lends to a cosmopolitan feeling reminiscent of old Istanbul. Former prime minister Tansu Çiller lives in a town-house on the seafront. In recent years Yeniköy has acquired a community of Filipinos, working as domestic help in the big villas.

Tarabya was formerly the Greek Theràpia, the name of which comes from the Greek word therapeia (therapy) and indicates the area's former use as a sanctuary from the city for the sick. It is now a classy neighbourhood, dominated by the once grand Tarabya Hotel. There are fish restaurants and 'taverna' featuring traditional Turkish music, drink, and atmosphere. Marmara University has a small site here, teaching French, housed in a villa built by Alexander Ypsilantis. A stream once flowed to the Bosphorus, but is now covered by concrete. Tarabya also is home to the German consulate.

Büyükdere was formerly the Greek-Byzantine Vathys Kòlpos District, 'the deep gulf' in Greek). It was originally a quiet residential area composed mostly of old, quiet neighborhoods. However, recent years have seen the construction of expensive apartments and condominiums. Home to a number of churches, the Spanish and Russian summer consulates and the Sadberk Hanim Museum. There are places to sit by the Bosphorus and sip tea.

Bahçeköy was formerly the Byzantine Petra district. One of the northern villages of Sarıyer. After Suleiman the Magnificent came back from Belgrade, he settled the Serbs in the nearby forest, which has since been known as the "Belgrade" Forest (Belgrad Ormanı.) In the 19th century, the village was inside the Belgrad Forest but due to the latter's retreat before development, Bahçeköy now sits on the forest's edge. Atatürk Arboretum is in Bahçeköy.

At one time, the Ottoman military would use the Belgrad Forest for military exercises. Today it is popular for picnics at the weekend, and the road to Kilyos passes through here. The woods are home to Istanbul University's department of  forestry, and are accessible by public transport. There have always been rural communities here but since the 1990s, luxury housing and private schools have been built in  parts of the forest. The largest of these developments is the new village of Zekeriyaköy, which is now one of the most expensive residential areas in Istanbul. The campus of the Koç University is also located in the forest. The growth of these areas may have, along with construction and poorly conceived traffic flow planning, contributed to the heavy traffic in the village of Sarıyer.

Kilyos is a small town, a pleasant retreat from the city, although it is often windswept in winter. Some Istanbul residents swim in the sea at Kilyos, although the rocky coast and strong currents, including, in places, a dangerous undertow, may make swimming here risky. The road to Kilyos leads through the Belgrad Forest with its system of viaducts and reservoirs going back to the Ottoman period, although it is also accessible through the village of Sarıyer, leading to serious traffic delays during summer months. There are lovely cool spots to stop in the forest or go for a country walk, and the hilltops have marvellous views of the Bosphorus and the Black Sea. For many years this area has been a popular spot for picnics. In recent years Kilyos has acquired a number of bars and cafés, including a couple of well-known private beach clubs and a rock festival in summer. There are still beaches though and plenty of spots for a picnic, so on Sundays long queues of cars snake through the forest honking their horns at each other.

Climate 
Sarıyer's climate, typical of northern Istanbul, is oceanic (Cfb/Do) according to both Köppen and Trewartha climate classifications, with cool winters and warm summers. Sarıyer's climate is marked by high precipitation (the highest annual precipitation in Istanbul), milder summers and slightly colder winters than most of lowland Istanbul. However, Lodos, the well-known southwesterly common to all of Istanbul, functions as a Foehn wind in Sarıyer (as in the rest of northern Istanbul), causing temperatures to rise to or above  in winter. It is classified as USDA hardiness zone 8b with pockets of 8a, and AHS heat zone 3.

Places of interest

Rumelihisarı – the huge fortress on the Bosphorus built during the Ottoman Conquest of Istanbul.
Sakıp Sabancı Museum
Sadberk Hanım Museum
Borusan Contemporary – a museum of contemporary fine arts.
Rumeli Feneri, aka Türkeli Feneri – a historic lighthouse in the Rumelifeneri village.
Ottoman era wooden seafront houses (yalı).
The historic aqueducts of the Belgrad Forest – another important piece of historical architecture in the area.
İstinye Park, one of the upmarket shopping malls in Istanbul.
Istanbul Stock Exchange building at İstinye.
Maslak business district.
Telli Baba tomb of a Muslim saint.
 Nature parks:
 Bentler Nature Park, a nature park with historic dams in Bahçeköy neighborhood, 
 Falih Rıfkı Atay Nature Park, a nature park inside Belgrad Forest,
 Fatih Sultan Mehmet Nature Park
 Irmak Nature Park, a nature park inside Belgrad Forest,
 Kömürcübent Nature Park, a nature park inside Belgrad Forest,
 Mehmet Akif Ersoy Nature Park, a nature park inside Belgrad Forest,
 Neşet Suyu Nature Park, a nature park inside Belgrad Forest,
 Türkmenbaşı Nature Park, a protected area in Çayırbaşı neighborhood.
 Garipçe, Sarıyer, a village on the Bosphorus popular for its fish restaurants.

Sports

The football club Sarıyer S.K. was the winner of 1992 Balkans Cup winner and played in Süper Lig for 13 seasons. They are currently playing in the TFF Second League.

Although Galatasaray S.K. established in 1905 at the Galatasaray High School which is located in Galatasaray district and the club keeps Hasnun Galip Club Administrative Center in Beyoğlu until 2011; Galatasaray S.K. relocated the Club Administrative Center to Nef Stadium in 2011, which is in Sarıyer, after the club left their former home ground Ali Sami Yen Stadium.

The women's football club Kireçburnu Spor play in the Turkish Women's First Football League.

The women's volleyball team of Sarıyer Belediyespor compete in the Turkish Women's Volleyball League.

Çayırbaşı Stadium is home to several football clubs in Sarıyer.

Villages of Sarıyer
The villages of Sarıyer district include Rumelikavağı, Garipçe, Rumelifeneri, Demirciköy, Zekeriyaköy, Bahçeköy, Kilyos (Kumköy), Uskumruköy, Gümüşdere, and Kısırkaya (the westernmost point of Sarıyer district).

Education

Primary and secondary schools:
 British International School Istanbul Zekeriyaköy Campus in Zekeriyakoy
 Istanbul International Community School Hisar Campus
 Lycée Français Pierre Loti d'Istanbul Tarabya Campus
 Tarabya British Schools Tarabya and Yeniköy campuses

Universities:
 Beykent University Ayazağa - Maslak Campus
 Istanbul Technical University Ayazaga Campus
 Koç University Main & Batı Campus

Twin towns — sister cities
Sarıyer is twinned with:
  Aachen, Germany (2013)
  Salisbury, United Kingdom
  Akhalkalaki, Georgia
  Puerto Princesa, Philippines
  Çekmeköy, Turkey
  Vác, Hungary
  Enfield, United Kingdom

See also
Topuzlu Dam, built in 1750
Valide Dam, built in 1796
New Dam, built in 1830

References

External links

 İstanbul Stock Exchange (in English)
   Koç University
 Sariyer Portal

 
Bosphorus
Populated places in Istanbul Province
Fishing communities in Turkey
Districts of Istanbul Province
Edge cities in Turkey